Middlesbrough Ironopolis Football Club was a football club based in Middlesbrough, England.

Although it was only in existence for five years, the club won three Northern League
titles, two cup competitions and once reached the FA Cup quarter-finals.

They were based at the Paradise Ground.

History

The club was formed in 1889 by some members of Middlesbrough F.C., an amateur club at the time, who wanted the town of Middlesbrough to have a professional club.  The team played its first ever non-competitive game against Gainsborough Trinity on 14 December 1889 at home.  The match ended in a 1–1 draw.

League and Cup
Middlesbrough Ironopolis played in the Northern League from 1890 to 1893, winning three consecutive titles. In their first season, they reached the Fourth Qualifying Round of the FA Cup, losing to Darlington.  During the 1892–93 season, the team reached the quarter-finals of the FA Cup before losing to Preston North End in a replay, after drawing the first game.

Following an abortive attempt to enter the Football League in combination with Middlesbrough F.C., under the name Middlesbrough and Ironopolis, Ironopolis were accepted into the Second Division for the 1893–94 season, replacing Accrington who had resigned. Competing in the league alongside them were Liverpool, Newcastle United, and Woolwich Arsenal (now known simply as Arsenal). Ironopolis finished 11th out of 15 clubs, recording wins against Small Heath (now Birmingham City), 3–0, and over Ardwick (now Manchester City) 2–0. They played in total 28 games, won 8, drew 4, lost 16, scored 37 goals, conceded 72, and finished with 20 points. The squad that season was: G. Watts; J. Elliott, Philip Bach; Thomas Seymour, Robert Chatt, R. Nicholson; J. Hill, Archibald M Hughes, Thomas McCairns, P. Coupar, Wallace McReddie.

The club lost its stadium, the Paradise Ground, which was adjacent to Middlesbrough F.C.'s Ayresome Park, at the end of the season.  Its financial position was poor, as gate receipts did not cover the cost of players' wages and the costs of travelling to fixtures in distant parts of England. In February 1894 all the professional players were served notice of the plans to liquidate the team. The club's final game was a 1–1 draw against South Bank on 30 April 1894.  Ironopolis resigned from the Football League the following month and disbanded. Ironopolis and Bootle are the only two clubs to have spent a single season in the Football League.

Seasons

Name and colours
The club was formed during the late Victorian industrial boom and adopted the name "Ironopolis" (iron-city) partly to emphasise this (Middlesbrough was then a centre for iron and steel production; see Teesside Steelworks) and also to distinguish itself from the other local club, Middlesbrough F.C.

The club had three sets of colours in its brief history; initially a maroon and dark green kit, later changed to a dark blue kit with a white sash, and on entry to the Football League, its best-known kit; cherry red and white stripes.

Honours
Northern League Division One
Champions: 1890–91, 1891–92, 1892–93
FA Cup
Quarter-finalists: 1892–93
Cleveland Charity Cup
Winners: 1889–90, 1892–93

See also
Middlesbrough and Ironopolis F.C.

References

External links

Association football clubs established in 1889
Association football clubs disestablished in 1894
Defunct English Football League clubs
Defunct football clubs in North Yorkshire
1889 establishments in England
1894 disestablishments in England
Sport in Middlesbrough